Acacia ryaniana is a shrub of the genus Acacia and the subgenus Phyllodineae that is endemic to an area along the west coast of Australia.

Description
Like most species of Acacia it has phyllodes rather than true leaves. The glabrous and coriaceous phyllodes have a single main nerve and are finely penninerved. It blooms from June to November and produces yellow flowers. It has simple inflorescences that are found singly in the axils with spherical flower-heads that have a diameter of around  containing 60 to 70 densely packed golden coloured flowers. The chartaceous, light brown or yellow-brown coloured seed pods that form after flowering are curved and rounded over the seeds.

Taxonomy
The species was first formally described by the botanist Bruce Maslin in 1992 as part of the work Acacia Miscellany. Review of Acacia victoriae and related species (Leguminosae: Mimosoideae: Section Phyllodineae) as published in the journal Nuytsia. It was reclassified as Racosperma ryanianum in 2003 by Leslie Pedley then transferred back to genus Acacia in 2006.
The shrub belongs to the Acacia victoriae group but can be distinguished by its prostrate habit and curved pods.

Distribution
It is native to an area in the Mid West and Gascoyne regions of Western Australia from around Northampton in the south through to Exmouth in the north where it is found on coastal sand dunes growing in sandy or clay soils often over limestone as a part of scrubland or heathland communities, often associated with species of spinifex.

See also
 List of Acacia species

References

ryaniana
Acacias of Western Australia
Plants described in 1992
Taxa named by Bruce Maslin